Live from Bonnaroo 2005 is a live EP by Ray LaMontagne, released on June 12, 2005. It contains five live versions of tracks from Lamontagne's debut album, Trouble, and one previously unreleased track. The EP is based on a small set that the singer played at the Bonnaroo Music Festival.

Track listing
 "Burn"
 "Trouble"
 "Shelter"
 "Empty" (previously unreleased)
 "Jolene"
 "Forever My Friend"

Personnel
Larry Ciancia – drums
Ray LaMontagne – acoustic guitar, lead vocals
Chris Thomas – upright bass

Ray LaMontagne albums
2005 EPs